Steve Fisher (born October 2, 1981 in Hershey, Pennsylvania) is an American soccer player who currently played for Harrisburg City Islanders in the USL Second Division.

Career

College
Fisher played college soccer at Lehigh University, where was a senior he led the Mountain Hawks in scoring with eight goals and 16 points, earned All-Patriot League First Team accolades, and was his school's Athlete of the Year.

Professional
Fisher turned professional when he signed with Harrisburg City Islanders of the USL Second Division in 2004, and has remained with the club ever since, having made over 80 appearances in 5 years. He was part of the Harrisburg team which won the 2007 USL-2 Championship. On February 2, 2010 Fisher announced his retirement from professional soccer, after playing the game for nearly six years.

References

External links
Harrisburg City Islanders bio

1981 births
Living people
American soccer players
Lehigh Mountain Hawks men's soccer players
Penn FC players
USL Second Division players
People from Hershey, Pennsylvania
Lehigh University alumni
Association football midfielders